Iretiola Olusola Doyle  (born 5 May 1967) is a Nigerian actress, entertainer, TV presenter, writer and  a public speaker.

Early life and education
Doyle was born on 3 May 1967 in Ondo State but spent her early years  with her family in Boston, United States. After returning to Nigeria, she attended Christ's School Ado Ekiti and obtained Diploma in Mass Communication and also graduated from the University of Jos with a degree in Theatre Arts.

Career
Doyle is a writer, actor, producer and presenter. She produced and presented her own fashion and lifestyle show titled Oge With Iretiola for ten years and at different times anchored several television shows, like Morning Ride, Today On STV and Nimasa This Week on Channels TV.

She was nominated at the 2016 Africa Movie Academy Awards in the Best Actress In A Leading Role category for her portrayal of Dr. Elizabeth in the Ebony Life film Fifty. She also appeared in The Arbitration and The Wedding Party, Other films include Dinner and Madam President.
On television, she has created characters on shows like Fuji House Of Commotion, Dowry, and Gidi Up.

Personal life
She was married to Patrick Doyle and has six children together. During the EndSars protest across the country when some palliatives were looted, Ireti said in her Twitter handle that it is as a result of hunger. She posted "I know we are renowned for loving awoof, but greed wasn't the reason for the stampede on palliatives, it was hunger. Acute hunger. That is something your leaders will never live down."

Selected filmography

Film
Across the Niger
Sitanda
Torn
The Therapist (2015)
Fifty (2015)
The Arbitration (2016)
The Wedding Party (2016)
Dinner (2016)
The Wedding Party 2 (2017)
Merry Men: The Real Yoruba Demons (2018)
Kasanova (2019)
Merry Men 2(2019)
Crazy People
Flawsome (2022)

Television
Tinsel
For Coloured Girls (2011)  
 Gidi Up (2014–present).
''Noughts and Crosses (2022)

See also
 List of Nigerian actors

Notes

References

External links

Nigerian film actresses
Yoruba actresses
University of Jos alumni
Nigerian expatriates in the United States
Actresses from Ondo State
21st-century Nigerian actresses
Nigerian television actresses
Living people
People from Ondo State
Christ's School, Ado Ekiti alumni
1967 births
Nigerian film producers
Nigerian film directors
Nigerian television presenters
Nigerian media personalities
Nigerian television personalities
Nigerian writers